Night Shifts is a 2020 Canadian short comedy film written and directed by Finn Wolfhard, starring Billy Bryk and Artoun Nazareth.

The short made its Canadian premiere at the 2020 Fantasia International Film Festival on August 24, 2020, where it also received the silver Audience Award for Best Canadian Short.

Synopsis 

A convenience store clerk is robbed at gunpoint. The gunman is revealed to the audience and the clerk to be an old friend of the clerk from high school. 

The two reconnect on the floor of the store. As they are conversing, the police show up as a result of the silent alarm being pressed. 

When the police man enters, he too is an old friend of both the clerk and the gunman.

Cast 
 Billy Bryk as Billy
 Artoun Nazareth as Artoun
 Malcolm Sparrow-Crawford as Elijah

Production 
On December 10, 2019, Wolfhard launched a fundraising campaign to produce the short film through Indiegogo, offering various incentives to those who donated and attained its goal of $26,000 Canadian dollars in a day.

The short was shot over the span of 12 hours in a Vancouver convenient store. During filming, an attempted robbery occurred.

Release 
The film premiered at the Fantasia Film Festival on August 24, 2020. It had its American premiere at the 11th Annual Atlanta Shortsfest on August 29, 2020.

Night Shifts was also an official selection for the 2020 Calgary International Film Festival.

The 2021 TIFF Next Wave Festival presented a free screening for 45 minutes on February 13, 2021. Wolfhard released Night Shifts on YouTube the next day.

Reception  
In a positive review, Kat Hughes of The Hollywood News rated the film 4/5 stars and stated that Night Shifts "demonstrates that Wolfhard has clearly been paying attention to the directors he has worked with as an actor" and found the dialogue to be "tightly written, funny, and conveys an impressive multitude of history and information in such a small amount of time" while adding that the film is "a clever and stylish little short that more than exemplifies that, should his acting work dry up, Finn Wolfhard has a promising career as a director." Diego Andaluz of The Global Film Podcast praised Wolfhard's "witty screenplay" and felt the film "proves that [Wolfhard] may have quite a future behind the camera."

The film received the silver Audience Award for Best Canadian Short. Wolfhard received the Best Director award for Night Shifts at the 2020 Atlanta Shortsfest.

References

External links 
 Finn Wolfhard's Night Shifts at YouTube
 Night Shifts at Fantasia International Film Festival
 Night Shifts at Calgary International Film Festival
 

2020 films
2020 comedy films
2020 short films
2020s English-language films
Canadian comedy short films
2020s Canadian films